Gobius scorteccii is a species of freshwater goby native to Somalia, Africa.  This species can reach a length of  TL. The specific name honours the Italian herpetologist Giuseppe Scortecci (1898-1973) of the University of Genoa, who was the collector of the type.

References

Endemic fauna of Somalia
scorteccii
Taxa named by Max Poll
Freshwater fish of Africa
Freshwater fish
Tropical fish
Fish described in 1961